The Pittsburgh Agreement was a memorandum of understanding completed on 31 May 1918 between members of Czech and Slovak expatriate communities in the United States of America. It replaced the Cleveland Agreement of October 22, 1915.

It is named for the city of Pittsburgh, Pennsylvania, where the agreement was made. The agreement prescribed the intent of the cosignatories to create an independent Czechoslovakia. This was achieved on 18 October 1918, when the primary author of the agreement, Tomáš Garrigue Masaryk, declared the independence of Czechoslovakia. Masaryk was elected the first president of Czechoslovakia in November, 1918.

Background
The historical setting of the Pittsburgh Agreement was the impending dissolution of the Austro-Hungarian Empire in the months prior to the end of World War I. By September, 1918, it was evident that the forces of the Habsburg monarchy, the rulers of Austria-Hungary, would be vanquished by the Allies: Britain, France and Russia. Between 1860 and 1918, close to one million people of Slovak and Czech ethnicity migrated to the United States and to other nations. At the time, these immigrants were officially recorded as Austrians or Hungarians (Magyars), which did not reflect their actual ethnic origin. However, the United States allowed Czech and Slovak nationalist groups to form and operate. On 22 October 1915, at the Bohemian National Hall on Broadway, Cleveland, Ohio the Slovak League of America and the Bohemian (Czech) National Alliance signed the Cleveland Agreement. With this, the two groups agreed to work together towards a united and independent state for Czechs and Slovaks. Joining the Czech and the Slovak population groups helped the Slovaks break away from the Hungarian state of the Austro-Hungarian Empire, and created a state with a clear Slavic majority to overcome the large German-speaking population of Bohemia.

Meeting
On Friday, 31 May 1918, a meeting of the Czecho-Slovak National Council under the presidency of Tomáš Garrigue Masaryk, was called into order at the Loyal Order of Moose Building, 628-634 Penn Avenue, Pittsburgh, Allegheny County, Pennsylvania, United States of America.
Present were representatives of fraternal organizations including the Slovak League of America; the Czech National Federation; the First Slovak Evangelical League and the Association of Czech Catholics. These associations represented immigrants to America from Bohemia, Moravia, Slovakia, and Czech Silesia. (Thursday 30 May 1918, the Memorial Day public holiday saw many Czech and Slovak residents of Pittsburgh come downtown to fete Masaryk's arrival).

The signed document bring data 30 May 1918.

Agreement
An agreement was drafted which read:

"1. We approve (sanction) the political program, which endeavors to bring about a Union of the Czechs and Slovaks in an independent state comprising the Czech Lands, (the lands of the Bohemian Crown) and Slovakia.

 2. Slovakia will have its own administration, its Diet and its courts.

 3. The Slovak language will be the official language in schools and in public life in general (in Slovakia).

 4. The Czecho-slovak state will be a republic, its Constitution will be democratic.

 5. The organization of the collaboration of the Czechs and the Slovaks in the United States will be amplified and adjusted according to the needs and according to the changing situation, by mutual agreement.

 6. Detailed rules concerning the organization of the Czecho-Slovak State are left to the liberated Czechs and Slovaks and their legal representatives (to establish)."

Signatories

Slovak

Ivan Bielek (1886–1941)
Bielek, born in Slovakia, was vice-president and director of the Czecho Slovak Commercial Corp. of America, an import company founded in 1918.

Michal Bosák (1869–1937)
Bosák, born in Okruhle, Slovakia was a banker and shipping agent who, during World War I, raised funds for the campaign for an independent Slovak nation.

Ivan Daxner (1860–1938)
Daxner was born in Nagykallo, the son of political activist, Stefan Marko Daxner. He became a banker and continued this profession on emigrating to the United States. He became the executive secretary of the Slovak League of America. He said,
 "Away from the Magyars, but not into Czech subservience; we want to join Czechs as equals."

Ján Adolf Ferienčík (1863–1925)
Ferienčík was the editor of Slovenský hlásnik (Slovak Herald), the weekly publication of the Slavonic Evangelical Union of America.

Matúš Gazdík

Ignác Gessay (1874–1928)
Gessay, born in the Orava region, Slovakia to a peasant family, became a school teacher before emigrating to the United States. In the United States, he worked as a journalist with Ján Pankúch.

Milan Alexander Getting (1878–1951)
Milan Getting was a Slovak journalist and politician and later a diplomat. He emigrated to the United States in 1902. He was a publisher of the newspaper of the Slovak Sokol.

Jozef Hušek (1880–1947)
Husek was born in Okolicne, Slovakia, a Catholic. He emigrated to the USA in 1903 and worked in journalism and the Slovak League of America.

Ján Janček Jr. (1881–1933)
Janček, born in Ruzomberok, Slovakia, was a writer and news editor and later, a politician and the mayor of Ruzomberok.

L. Jozef Karlovský (1887–1964)

Ján Kubašek (1885–1950)
Rev. Kubašek emigrated from Slovakia to Yonkers, the United States in 1902 and was ordained in 1914. He became president of the Association of Slovak Catholics.

Albert Mamatey (1870–1923)
Mamatey, born in Kláštor pod Znievom, Slovakia, was the president of the National Slovak Society and the Slovak League of America. He advocated the preservation of Slovak culture whilst also assisting Slovak immigrants to be well regarded in their new land.

Gejza H. Mika

Jozef Murgaš (1864–1929)
Rev. Murgaš was a Roman Catholic priest born in Tajov, Slovakia. In 1896, he emigrated to the United States to a Slovak parish in Wilkes-Barre, Pennsylvania. He was a founding member of the Slovak League of America.

Ján Pankúch (1869–1951)
Pankúch emigrated from Slovakia to the United States in 1885 and worked for the Slovak League of America. He was a journalist in Cleveland, Ohio.

Andrej Schustek
Schustek was chairman of the first district of the Slovak League of America. In Chicago, at the second anniversary of the independence of Czechoslovakia,

"He assured us, the Bohemians, that every Slovak is a sincere brother of ours, a son of one mother - Slovakia. He referred to the frequently overlooked fact that until recently, the Slovaks did not have their own Slovak schools, that ever since childhood they were brought up to hate Bohemians and everything Slavic. Therefore, it is not surprising that many of them are still against us today, especially when they are continually instigated by hired or voluntary agents."

Pavel Šiška
Rev. Šiška was the financial secretary of the Slovak League of America.

Czech

Vojta Beneš (1878–1951)
Beneš was born in Kožlany, as the brother of Edvard Beneš. Vojta Beneš was an organizer of the Bohemian National Alliance of America. In 1917, he published How Bohemians Organised, reflecting the nationalist movement.

Hynek Dostál (1871–1943)
Dostál was the editor of the Hlas newspaper of St. Louis and the editor of the journal of the Saint John Nepomuk Chapel, the first Czech Catholic newspaper in the United States.

Ludvík Fisher (1880–1945)
Fisher was president of the Czech National Alliance.

Innocent Kestl
Rev. Kestl was a Czech Catholic priest who became the vice president of the Czechoslovak National Council.

Josef Martínek (1889–1980)
Martinek, born in Poděbrady (nowadays Palackého street 130), a small town east of Prague, emigrated to Cleveland, Ohio as a metal worker. He became a newspaper editor, socialist and Czech nationalist.

Tomáš Garrigue Masaryk (1850–1937)
Masaryk was a member of the Austrian government and a philosopher at the University of Prague. He was key in securing the independence of the Czech people and became president of Czechoslovakia.

Joseph P. Pecivál

Karel Pergler (1882–1954)
Pergler, born in Liblin, Bohemia, emigrated to the United States in childhood. He became a lawyer and a journalist. Pergler was head of the Slav Press Bureau (founded in May, 1918) and was a part of the Bohemian National Alliance and the Bohemian Chapter of the Socialist Party of America. He later became Czechoslovak ambassador to the United States.

B. Simek
Bohumil Shimek was a Czech-American botanist who was active in the campaign for Czechoslovak independence in the United States.

Jan Straka

Oldřich Zlámal (1879–1955)
Rev. Zlámal was born in Korkory, Moravia. He was ordained in the Catholic Church in Cleveland, Ohio in 1904.

Jaroslav Joseph Zmrhal (1878–1951)
Zmrhal was a principal and superintendent in the Chicago Public Schools system.

Outcome
A Czech provisional government in Paris announced the Czechoslovak Declaration of Independence on 18 October 1918.

Archive
A calligraphic lithograph of the agreement was signed after the meeting. On 9 September 2007, the item was donated to the John Heinz History Center in Pittsburgh. Other copies are archived elsewhere worldwide.

References

External links
 Original Pittsburgh agreement on Czechoslovakia to return to Pittsburgh PopCityMedia.com website. 27 February 2007.
 Important dates from the life of T. G. Masaryk, the first president of the ČSR. Consulate General of Czech Republic in Montreal.
 History of Slovakia Embassy of the Slovak Republic in the United States of America.
 The Pittsburgh Agreement University of Pittsburgh.
 Masaryk and America - testimony of a relationship. Kovtun G. J. Library of Congress, 1988.

History of Pittsburgh
Czech-American history
Rusyn-American history
Silesian-American history
Slovak-American history
1918 in Czechoslovakia
1918 in Pennsylvania
Pittsburgh Labor History
1918 documents
May 1918 events